Francesco Saverio Vincenzo de Paolo Nitti (19 July 1868 – 20 February 1953) was an Italian economist and political figure. A Radical, he served as Prime Minister of Italy between 1919 and 1920.

According to the Catholic Encyclopedia ("Theories of Overpopulation"), Nitti (Population and the Social System, 1894) was a staunch critic of English economist Thomas Robert Malthus and his Principle of Population. He was an important meridionalist and studied the origins of Southern Italian problems that arose after Italian unification.

Life

Born at Melfi, Basilicata, Nitti studied law in Naples and was subsequently active as journalist. He was correspondent for the Gazzetta piemontese ("Piedmontese Gazette") and was one of the editors of the Corriere di Napoli ("Courier of Naples"). In 1891, he wrote the work Il socialismo cattolico ("Catholic Socialism"). In 1898, when he was only 30 years old, he became professor of finance at the University of Naples.

Nitti was chosen in 1904 for the Radical Party to serve in the Italian Parliament. From 1911 to 1914 he was minister of agriculture, industry and trade under Prime Minister Giovanni Giolitti. In 1917, he became minister of finance under Orlando and held it till 1919.

On 23 June 1919, Nitti became prime minister and interior minister. A year later, he was also minister of the colonies. His cabinet had to deal with great social unrest and dissatisfaction over Treaty of Versailles. Particularly troublesome was the agitation over Fiume led by Gabriele D'Annunzio. Nitti had great difficulty keeping the administration functioning at all, thanks to the enmity between the extremely divergent political factions of communists, anarchists and fascists. After less than a year as head of government, he resigned and was succeeded by the veteran Giolitti on 16 June 1920.

In social policy, Nitti’s government passed a law setting up compulsory insurance for unemployment, invalidity and old age.

Still a member of the Italian Parliament, Nitti offered resistance to the nascent power of fascism and openly despised Benito Mussolini. In his 1927 book, Bolshevism, Fascism and Democracy, he correlated Italian fascism with communism: "There is little difference between the two, and in certain respects, Fascism and Bolshevism are the same".

In 1924, Nitti decided to emigrate, but after the Second World War, he returned to Italy. He was elected to the Senate, first for the Italian Liberal Party in National Bloc and then for the Independent Left. As a secularist and anticlerical, he opposed Christian Democracy and staunchly opposed NATO membership.

He died on Rome on 20 February 1953. Throughout his career he opposed any kind of dictatorship, whether it was communist or fascist.

Notable works 

Population and the Social System (1894)
Catholic Socialism (1895, reprinted 1908)
Eroi e briganti (Heroes and brigands) (1899; reprinted by Osanna Edizioni, 2015) - , 9788881674695) 
L'Italia all'alba del secolo XX (1901)
 Principi di scienza delle finanzie (1903, 1904; 5th ed., 1922). French translation: Principes de science des finances, (1904) 
Peaceless Europe (1922) 
The Decadence of Europe (1922)
The Wreck of Europe (1923)
Bolshevism, Fascism and Democracy (1927)
other works online here (archive.org)

References

External links

 
 
 
 

1868 births
1953 deaths
People from Melfi
Italian Roman Catholics
Historical Far Left politicians
Italian Radical Party politicians
Democratic Liberal Party (Italy) politicians
Prime Ministers of Italy
Agriculture ministers of Italy
Italian Ministers of the Interior
Deputies of Legislature XXII of the Kingdom of Italy
Deputies of Legislature XXIII of the Kingdom of Italy
Deputies of Legislature XXIV of the Kingdom of Italy
Deputies of Legislature XXV of the Kingdom of Italy
Deputies of Legislature XXVI of the Kingdom of Italy
Members of the National Council (Italy)
Members of the Constituent Assembly of Italy
Senators of Legislature I of Italy
Politicians of Basilicata
Exiled Italian politicians